Pål Angell-Hansen (16 May 1925 – 23 September 1990) was a Norwegian footballer. He played in one match for the Norway national football team in 1953.

References

External links
 
 

1925 births
1990 deaths
Norwegian footballers
Norway international footballers
Place of birth missing
Association football forwards
Frigg Oslo FK players